Einar Sandberg (3 November 1905 – 5 July 1987) was a Norwegian footballer. He played in one match for the Norway national football team in 1926.

References

External links
 

1905 births
1987 deaths
Norwegian footballers
Norway international footballers
Place of birth missing
Association footballers not categorized by position